Karel Kroupa (born 15 April 1950) is a former Czech football player, considered as legendary player of Zbrojovka Brno.

Kroupa played his whole professional career for Zbrojovka Brno. He appeared in 277 league matches and scored 118 goals, becoming the best goalscorer of the club in its history. Kroupa won the Czechoslovak First League with Brno in 1978. It is the only championship for this team to date.

Being a prolific goalscorer, Kroupa became the top scorer of Czechoslovak First League in 1978 and 1979. In 1977, he was voted the Czechoslovak Footballer of the Year.

Kroupa was a member of the Czechoslovakia national football team and played for his country total 21 matches, scoring 4 goals.

His son Karel is also a professional footballer.

External links
  Profile at FC Zbrojovka Brno website
 Profile at ČMFS website

1950 births
Czech footballers
Czechoslovak footballers
Czechoslovakia international footballers
FC Zbrojovka Brno players
FC Fastav Zlín players
Footballers from Brno
Living people
Association football forwards